Red Handed (1962−1990) was a New-Zealand bred, Australian-trained Thoroughbred racehorse, who won the 1967 Melbourne Cup.

He was sired by Le Filou (FR), his dam Red Might (NZ) was by Red Mars (GB).

The horse was purchased in New Zealand relatively cheaply by Bart Cummings for the sum of 870 guineas. This was due to the horse having a club foot and a paralysed ear (an injury incurred as a result of being kicked in the head by another horse as a yearling, paralysing the nerves down one side of his face).

Despite being headed in the straight by Red Crest, Red Handed fought back to win the race under hard riding from jockey Roy Higgins.

References
 Red Handed's pedigree and partial racing stats

1962 racehorse births
Racehorses bred in New Zealand
Racehorses trained in Australia
Melbourne Cup winners
Thoroughbred family 22-b
1990 racehorse deaths